William John Malinchak (born April 2, 1944) is a former American football wide receiver and special teams ace in the National Football League in the 1960s and 1970s. He attended suburban Pittsburgh's Monessen High School.  His pro-career was spent with both the Detroit Lions and the Washington Redskins.

Malinchak caught few passes as a Redskins receiver but perfected the art of rushing the punter and blocking kicks.  Redskins head coach George Allen was an innovator in placing great emphasis on special teams play and in Bill Malinchak Coach Allen found one of his finest special teams players.  In Malinchak's best season, 1972–1973, his special teams play helped the Redskins to advance to the Super Bowl VII where they lost to the "perfect season" Miami Dolphins.

1944 births
Living people
Sportspeople from Pennsylvania
American football wide receivers
Players of American football from Pennsylvania
Indiana Hoosiers football players
Detroit Lions players
Washington Redskins players